El Desperado is the second album by rock band, Let 3. The album was released in 1989 by Helidon.

The album was digitally remastered in 2009 by Dallas Records following the 20 year anniversary of the album Two dogs fuckin' alongside the album.

The song Vjeran Pas is a cover of the song with the same name from the rock band Termiti of which Mrle was a part of. The lyrics are credited to Predrag Kraljević, the former frontman of Termiti.

Reception

The album was received as a nice follow up to their previous album by fans and critics.

Track listing

Personnel
Damir Martinović – Mrle (bass, vocal)
Zoran Prodanović – Prlja (vocal)
Ivica Dražić – Miki (guitar, voice)
Zoran Klasić – Klas (guitar, voice)
Dean Benzia (drums, voice)
Backing Vocals – Edi Kraljić, Nina Simić
Design – Dalibor Laginja
Executive Producer – Goran Lisica
Keyboards – Raoul Varljen
Lyrics By – Damir Martinović (tracks: 1, 3, 6 to 14), Igor Večerina (tracks: 11), 
Zoran Prodanović (tracks: 1, 3, 5, 8, 15), Predrag Kraljević (tracks: 6)
Recorded By – Toni Jurij (tracks: 12 to 14)
Recorded By, Mixed By, Producer – Janez Križaj

References

1991 albums
Let 3 albums